Thirteen is a 1986 Emmylou Harris album. The title came from its status as her thirteenth studio album (if one does not count her 1969 first album, released on an independent label, which Harris herself rarely acknowledges).

For unexplained reasons, the album was taken out of print a few years after its initial release, making it one of the most sought-after albums in Harris' catalogue by fans, with used copies commanding unusually high prices on eBay and other used records sites. The album was produced by Harris' then-husband, Paul Kennerley. Though the album, to date, has never been separately issued on CD, in April 2011 it was made available for download in iTunes Store. It became available as a CD in 2013 in a compilation issued by the Rhino Entertainment Company called Emmylou Harris Original Album Series Vol.2.

Track listing

Personnel
 Mike Bowden - bass
 Steve Cash - harmonica 
 Rodney Crowell - backing vocals
 Steve Fishell - steel guitar, slide guitar, resonator guitar
 Vince Gill - backing vocals
 Carl Jackson - mandolin, fiddle, banjo, acoustic guitar, backing vocals 
 Don Johnson - keyboards 
 Shane Keister - synthesizer 
 Mary Ann Kennedy - backing vocals
 Paul Kennerley - acoustic guitar 
 Mark O'Connor - fiddle
 Frank Reckard - mandolin, electric guitar, acoustic guitar 
 Pam Rose - backing vocals
 Buddy Spicher - fiddle
 Barry Tashian - backing vocals, accordion
 Steve Turner - drums, percussion
 Paul Worley - acoustic guitar 
 Emmylou Harris - vocals, acoustic guitar

Chart performance

References

Emmylou Harris albums
1986 albums
Warner Records albums